Eric John Nenninger (born November 19, 1978) is an American actor, best known for playing Scott Braddock in the 2003 horror film, Jeepers Creepers II, he had a recurring role as Cadet Eric Hanson on Malcolm in the Middle and Scott in One Day at a Time.

Early life and education
Nenninger was born in St. Louis, Missouri where he attended Ladue Horton Watkins High School. In 1997, Nenninger moved to Los Angeles to attend the American Academy of Dramatic Arts. In 2000, he started to train at the British American Drama Academy in Oxford.

Career
Nenninger has starred in two films, Jeepers Creepers 2 and The Pool at Maddy Breaker's, and appeared in several TV series, including The X-Files, NCIS, CSI: Crime Scene Investigation, Generation Kill, and Malcolm in the Middle. He has a supporting role on the TV series Glory Daze. In 2011, Nenninger co-starred as the voice and likeness of Matthew Ryan, an employee for the fictional company InstaHeat in the case, "The Gas Man" in the Arson desk in the video game L.A. Noire.

Personal life
He is married to actress Angel Parker and they have two children together.

Filmography

References

External links

1978 births
21st-century American male actors
American Academy of Dramatic Arts alumni
American male film actors
American male television actors
Alumni of the British American Drama Academy
Ladue Horton Watkins High School alumni
Living people
Male actors from St. Louis